Hooe Common is a village in the Wealden district of East Sussex.

References

Villages in East Sussex